Tuvalu is a Polynesian island nation.

Tuvalu may also refer to:

 Tuvalu (novel), 2006 novel by Australian author Andrew O'Connor
 Tuvalu (film), a 1999 German film
 Tuvalu (band), a Finnish indie rock band